Valiergues is a commune in the Corrèze department in central France.

Geography
The Triouzoune forms part of the commune's southwestern boundary.

Population

See also
Communes of the Corrèze department

References

Communes of Corrèze
Corrèze communes articles needing translation from French Wikipedia